The northern silvery kingfisher (Ceyx flumenicola) is a species of bird in the family Alcedinidae that is endemic to the Philippines being found in the Visayas on the islands of Bohol, Leyte and Samar. This species and the southern silvery kingfisher, which is found on Mindanao, were formerly considered conspecific and called the silvery kingfisher. Its natural habitats are tropical moist lowland forests, streams and rivers. It is threatened by habitat loss.

Description 

EBird describes the bird as "A small, dashing kingfisher of forested lowland streams in the central Philippines. Overall dark blue in color, more purplish on the underparts, with a creamy throat, a cream-colored spot behind the cheek, an orange spot behind the nostril, a white belly, a pale silvery-blue stripe down the back to the tail, and whitish flecks on the head and wing. Legs bright red. Unmistakable. Voice is a simple, high-pitched “tseep,” often given in flight."

It is differentiated from its southern counterpart by its cream colored throat, cheek and belly versus the bluish-white parts of the Southern silvery kingfisher.

Habitat and Conservation Status 
It appears to be reliant upon forested streams below 1,000 m and will tolerate secondary and selectively logged forest and even streamside vegetation within coconut plantations, close to forest edge.

IUCN has assessed this bird as near threatened with the population being estimatesd at 1,500 to 7,000 mature individuals. This species' main threat is habitat loss with wholesale clearance of forest habitats as a result of logging, agricultural conversion and mining activities occurring within the range.

Extensive lowland deforestation throughout its range is the chief threat. Only 4% forest cover is estimated to remain on Bohol. Most remaining lowland forest is leased to logging concessions or mining applications. Watercourses with high siltation loads, resulting from deforestation, appear not to hold the species, and riverine pollution is likely to have a similar impact. Tree-cutting, agricultural expansion, including pesticide (specifically Carbofuran) contamination from commercial growing of banana, and soil erosion are all threats to Rajah Sikatuna National Park (Bohol), a key sites for the species. Conversion of terminalia forest into rice fields and oil palm plantation is driving habitat loss elsewhere. Current laws protecting riverine habitats are weak and require revision.

References

Collar, N.J. 2011. Species limits in some Philippine birds including the Greater Flameback Chrysocolaptes lucidus. Forktail number 27: 29–38.

External links

BirdLife Species Factsheet

northern silvery kingfisher
Endemic birds of the Philippines
northern silvery kingfisher
northern silvery kingfisher